Beka I Jaqeli (c. 1240 – 1306) was a Georgian ruling prince (mtavari) of Samtskhe (1285–1306). His principality included Samtskhe, Adjara, Shavsheti, Klarjeti, Lazia (Chaneti), Tao, Kola, Artaani and most of Javakheti. His realm stretched from Tashiskari (modern Khashuri District) to Karnu-kalaki (now Erzurum) and the Black Sea. During his reign, Samtskhe-Saatabago existed as a politically independent entity from the Georgian Kingdom. Beka was a vassal of the Ilkhanate, paid regular tributes and participated in their campaigns. Despite being independent, Samtskhe still maintained some kind of relations with Georgia and Beka himself was given a title of Mandaturukhutsesi (the elder - first in rank - Mandator) by Georgian king. At the time of Beka's rule, the Turks became more active the Southwest borders, from the Sultanate of Rum. After a series of invasions, he managed to fend off the attacks. Beka was a supporter of maintaining Georgian political influence over the Empire of Trebizond. For this cause, he married off his daughter Jiajak to the Trapezuntine Emperor Alexios II. Another daughter of Beka, - Natela, became the consort of Demetrius II of Georgia and bore him a son and the successor to the throne. After the execution of his father Demetrius by Mongols, future king George V was raised by his grandfather at his court.

References

Atabegs of Samtskhe
Nobility of Georgia (country)
13th-century people from Georgia (country)
14th-century people from Georgia (country)
Military personnel from Georgia (country)
House of Jaqeli
1240 births
1306 deaths